University Grants Committee of Hong Kong is a non-statutory advisory committee responsible for counselling the Government of Hong Kong on the financing and expansion needs of its subsidised higher education institutions. Appointed by the Chief Executive of Hong Kong, its members consist of local and overseas academics, university administrators and community leaders.

List
UGC-funded universities are:

 University of Hong Kong (HKU)
 Chinese University of Hong Kong (CUHK)
 Hong Kong University of Science and Technology (HKUST)
 Hong Kong Polytechnic University (PolyU)
 City University of Hong Kong (CityU)
 Hong Kong Baptist University (HKBU)
 Lingnan University (LingU)
 Education University of Hong Kong (EdUHK)

Quality Assurance Council 
The Quality Assurance Council (QAC), established in April 2007, is a semi-autonomous non-statutory body operating under the purview of the Committee to facilitate quality assurance of all programmes at the levels of sub-degree, first degree and above (however funded), offered by the UGC-funded universities.

Research Grants Council 
The Research Grants Council (RGC), established in January 1991, is a non-statutory advisory council functioning under the aegis of the Committee. It is responsible for providing suggestions to the Government on the needs of Hong Kong's higher education institutions in academic research and distribution of funding for research projects undertaken by the UGC-funded universities.

See also 
 List of higher education institutions in Hong Kong
 Higher education in Hong Kong
 Education in Hong Kong
 Education Bureau
 University Grants Commission (disambiguation)
Self-financing Higher Education in Hong Kong

References

External links 
 University Grants Committee
 University Grants Committee Secretariat
 Quality Assurance Council
 Research Grants Council

Higher education in Hong Kong
Education in Hong Kong
1965 establishments in Hong Kong